D' Biel Transportation Company is a bus company operated in Zamboanga City and Basilan province. It is a family business currently spearheaded by the Zamboanga City Lone District Councilor, Luis Biel III with a fleet of at least 50 buses and UV Express Service.

History

Late 1990s to 2006 
D' Biel Transportation Company is a family business of both Rubio and Biel Family who are known in local politics along Zamboanga City and Basilan Province. Initiated by the late Isabela City Mayor, Luis Rubio Biel II in the late 1990s. it started with at least 5 Isuzu Journey surplus buses from Japan, around 10 Isuzu Forward trucks that are remodified into buses, and to at least 5 to 10 Isuzu Elf  trucks which are modified into jeepneys. They initially serve the Zamboanga City's downtown (Zamboanga City Public Market / ZCPM) to Barangay Labuan in Zamboanga City and an inter-connecting route from Isabela City, Basilan to Lamitan City, Basilan.

Their buses are well known by its iconic livery with the name "La Virgen Milagrosa" (Chavacano: The Miraculous Virgin), which depicts to the patron saint of Zamboanga City, The Our Lady of Pilar, and the "Rubiel" text in the front which is a short term for their family name "Rubio" and "Biel".

With their family came as the prominent politicians along the areas which D' Biel Transportation is serving, Luis Rubio Biel II constructed a bus terminal along Isabela City which is today's Isabela City West Terminal.

In year 2000, the company offers rent-a-car service such as bridal car and public utility vans. Once started with a Nissan Sentra, it grew with Honda Civic, and to at least five Nissan Urvan and Toyota Hiace van units.

With their business continuously growing and as they gained popularity in politics, it lures some terrorist group to extort their family and their business. Several threats were made against Luis Rubio Biel II. But it didn't stop him to pursue his leadership for Isabela City. Branded as the "Father of Isabela City", a Subanon Tribal Council noted how Biel II “proudly promoted the new city as a tourism destination mainly for its people’s rich and unique cultural diversity.” In his eight years in public service since his first election in 1998, Biel II built a city hospital, government complex, public markets, two bus terminals, schools, day care and feeding centers for children, multi-purpose and barangay halls, roads for farmers, cultural centers for his Muslim constituents as well as Christians, health units, and many more.

However, on March 3, 2006 Biel II was shot dead inside the City Hall by the lone attacker Javer Gani. Gani was then killed by security forces, but four other people were wounded in the cross-fire. The management took place by his son, Luis Biel III.

2006 to present 

Luis Biel III started his political career in Zamboanga City as a city councilor since 2007, while Luis Biel VI continued the legacy of his father in Isabela City. 

By that time, their buses are starting to get old and are in need of heavy maintenance. By then, the bus company grew up with a coachbuilding division at their headquarters in order to cater their needs. Later on, they imported additional Isuzu Forward trucks which later converted into buses. Several imports were made from Pilipinas Hino Motors Inc., around another 5 Isuzu Journey buses imported from Japan, and a sum of Toyota Coasters. The fleet size grew from around 50 to now at least at least a hundred units.
In 2014, they modernized their fleets with additional units from Almazora Motors Corporation. It also added with several Hyundai County buses for their Tourist services.

In the same year, D' Biel added a new route for Zamboanga City downtown (ZCPM) to Barangay Sangali.

Up until today, no other bus company managed to compete with D' Biel services. Still, they are the lone bus operator in Basilan Province and the lone bus operator to serve the inter-city bus services for Zamboanga City. Meanwhile, his sons are also active in politics and their company still receives extortions from terrorist groups demanding money from their company such as the Abu Sayyaf Group.

Fleet 

These are their bus units as of 2016:
 Isuzu Journey (Airconary)
 Isuzu Journey (Ordinary Fare)
 Isuzu Forward (remodified into a bus)
 Isuzu Elf (remodified into a bus)
 Isuzu NQR Almazora Minibus
 Isuzu NQR Minibus - D' Biel Prototype
 Hyundai County
 Hino RF (body by Pilipinas-Hino Motors Inc.)
They also serve a rent-a-car service with these following fleet:
 Honda Civic
 Toyota Hiace D4D
 Nissan Urvan

Routes 
 Isabela City - Lamitan City
 Zamboanga City Public Market - Labuan (inter-city transport)
 Zamboanga City Public Market - Sangali (inter-city transport)

Bus Terminals 
 Magay Terminal, Magay St., corner Tomas Claudio St., Zamboanga City
 Labuan, Zamboanga City
 San Jose Road., Baliwasan, Zamboanga City (D' Biel Headquarters)
 Isabela City West Terminal (Operated also by the Isabela City LGU)
 Lamitan City Integrated Bus Terminal (Operated also by the Lamitan City LGU)

Notable incidents 
Most of their incidents were due to extortions.
 On September 20, 2013, at least three people were reported killed while one was injured after an improvised explosive device (IED) blasted a passenger bus in Zamboanga City. Chief Insp. Ariel Huesca, Zamboanga peninsula regional police spokesman, said the IED exploded at a "Biel Transit" bus number 2871 with a plate number JAW 651. The bus was parked at the bus storage in Barangay Labuan, a coastal village 35 kilometers from the city proper.
 On September 18, 2015, a young girl was killed while several others were injured in an explosion at a bus terminal in a public market in Tomas Claudio Street, Zamboanga City.  Sources from the Philippine National Police (PNP) said the bus, which came from Barangay Labuan, had just arrived at the terminal when an unidentified passenger left a plastic bag inside the bus' trash bin. Suspecting something, the bus conductor took the plastic to move it to another area. This prompted the explosion.

See also 
 Yellow Bus Line
 Aleson Shipping Lines
 Ever Shipping Lines

References 

Bus companies of the Philippines
Transportation in Mindanao
Companies based in Zamboanga City